The 2021 Pan American Track Cycling Championships took place at the National Sports Village (VIDENA) velodrome in Lima, Peru from 26 to 29 June 2021.

Medal summary

Men

Women

Medal table

References

External links
Results

Pan American Road and Track Championships
Americas
Cycling
International sports competitions hosted by Peru
Sports competitions in Lima
June 2021 sports events in South America